Karl Stephenson may refer to:

Karl Stephenson (musician) 
Karl Stephenson (badminton) in Greenlandic National Badminton Championships

See also
Carl Stephenson (disambiguation)